Vakhtang "Vato" Natsvlishvili. (born January 28, 1976) is a retired Georgian professional basketball player. He was the captain of Georgian National Basketball Team from 1997 till 2007.

Career
Throughout his career, Vato Natsvlishvili has played in different European basketball clubs. He represented the Georgian national basketball team from 1994 to 2007 as well. Later in his career, Natsvlishvili played in Georgia. His best career game with the national team was against Turkey on 3 December 1997, he scored 33 points with 8 rebounds.

Personal life
Natsvilishvili is married to a model Nino Tskitishvili, a sister of basketball player Nika Tskitishvili. His daughter, Tako is a model as well.

References
http://gbf.ge/en/news/vakhtang-natsvlishvili-davith-berdzenishvili-da-irakli-baqradze-qarthuli-kalathburthis-gza-evrobasketamde

External links
Georgian Superleague profile
Eurobasket.com profile
Basketball-reference profile
Georgian Athletes Biographical Dictionary

1976 births
Living people
Bnei Hertzeliya basketball players
Expatriate basketball people from Georgia (country) in France
Expatriate basketball people from Georgia (country) in Portugal
JDA Dijon Basket players
Karşıyaka basketball players
Men's basketball players from Georgia (country)
Power forwards (basketball)
Expatriate basketball people from Georgia (country) in Spain
Expatriate basketball people from Georgia (country) in Turkey
Expatriate basketball people from Georgia (country) in Israel
Expatriate basketball people from Georgia (country) in Bulgaria